Erna Denera (4 September 1881 – 16 March 1938) was a German operatic soprano and voice teacher. She was a member of the Berliner Hofoper (Berlin Royal Opera), from 1908 to 1921 and was awarded the title Kammersängerin.

Denera was born in Murowana-Goslin, Province of Posen, Prussia (Murowana Goślina, Poland), she died in Berlin at age 56.

Recordings 

References

Further reading 
 K. J. Kutsch, Leo Riemens: Großes Sängerlexikon. Original edition. K. G. Saur, Bern, 1993, first volume A–L, Sp. 702 f., 
 Paul Alfred Merbach: Erna Denera. In Bühne und Welt. 14, 1911/1912, .
 Erich H. Müller: Deutsches Musiker-Lexikon. Dresden 1929.
 . Volume 1. Zürich 1953.
 Deutsche Biographische Enzyklopädie 2nd edition, volume 2. Munich 2005, .
 Discographie Erna Denera, In Discographie der deutschen Gesangsaufnahmen, volume 4. Bonn: Lotz 2005.

External links 
 
 

1881 births
1938 deaths
People from Poznań County
People from the Province of Posen
German operatic sopranos
20th-century German  women opera singers